Tashkent City Professional Cycling Team is an Uzbekistan Men's road bicycle racing team, established in 2022, which participates in elite Men's races.

Team roster

Major wins
No wins yet

National, continental, and world champions
2022
 Uzbekistan Road Race, Akramjon Sunnatov
 Uzbekistan Time Trial, Aleksey Fomovskiy

References

UCI Continental Teams (Asia)
Cycling teams based in Uzbekistan
Cycling teams established in 2022